See also List of institutions named after Thomas Aquinas
Aquinas College may refer to any one of several educational institutions:

In Australia
Aquinas College, Perth, Roman Catholic boys' R–12 school 
Aquinas College, Adelaide, residential college for university students in South Australia
Aquinas College, Melbourne, Roman Catholic co-educational secondary school
Aquinas College, Southport, Roman Catholic co-educational secondary school in Queensland
Xavier High School, Albury, Roman Catholic co-educational secondary school formed from the amalgamation of St Joseph's College for girls and the Aquinas Boys College in 1983
Aquinas Catholic College, Menai, Sydney, a Roman Catholic co-educational secondary school

In New Zealand
Aquinas College, Otago – University of Otago Residential College
Aquinas College, Tauranga – Roman Catholic coeducational secondary school for years 7 to 13

In Sri Lanka 

 Aquinas College of Higher Studies - vocational university in Sri Lanka

In the United Kingdom
Aquinas College, Stockport – Roman Catholic college of further education.

In the United States
Aquinas College (Massachusetts) – former Roman Catholic junior college for women
Aquinas College (Michigan) – private, Roman Catholic, liberal arts college in Grand Rapids
Aquinas College (Tennessee) – private, Roman Catholic, liberal arts college in Nashville
Thomas Aquinas College (Ventura County, California) –  Private Roman Catholic liberal arts college